Ciarforon or Charforon (3,642m), is a mountain in the Gran Paradiso Massif of the Graian Alps on the border of Aosta Valley and Piedmont, Italy.

Location 
It lies south of Gran Paradiso, on the watershed between Valsavarenche and the Orco Valley. It boasts a mighty dome-shaped summit and a huge ice sheet on its upper slopes. The mountain is glaciated on all four sides.

References

Mountains of the Graian Alps
Alpine three-thousanders
Mountains of Aosta Valley
Mountains of Piedmont